Corrimal High School is a government-funded co-educational comprehensive secondary day school located in East Corrimal, a suburb of  in the Illawarra region of New South Wales, Australia.

Established in 1951, the school enrolled approximately 320 students in 2018, from Year 7 to Year 12, including 17 percent who identified as Indigenous Australians and 20 percent who were from a language background other than English. The school is operated by the New South Wales Department of Education; and the principal is Paul Roger.

History
It was established in 1951.

In 2018, a fire destroyed the school's industrial arts building, which was rebuilt at a cost of $8 million as an industrial arts and technology building and reopened in 2022.

Notable alumni
 Scott Chiperfieldsoccer player; played with the Wollongong Wolves and the Socceroos
 Graeme Hensonjudge of the District Court of New a South Wales and Chief Magistrate of the Local Court of New South Wales
 Vince Jonesjazz trumpet player, singer and songwriter
 Russell Mulcahyfilm director of movies such as Highlander and On the Beach as well as many music video clips
 Dr Reg Piperformer Anglican Bishop of Wollongong and a former assistant bishop in the Diocese of Sydney
 Craig Youngformer rugby league football player; played with St. George Dragons, the NSW Blues, and the Kangaroos
 Ian Laidlaw - Photographer based primarily in the Australian music industry documenting and touring internationally with various artists.

See also 

 List of government schools in New South Wales
 List of schools in Illawarra and the South East (New South Wales)
 Education in Australia

References

External links 
 

Public high schools in New South Wales
Schools in Wollongong
Educational institutions established in 1951
1951 establishments in Australia